Senna surattensis is a plant species of the legume family (Fabaceae) in the subfamily Caesalpinioideae.

References

surattensis
Taxa named by Nicolaas Laurens Burman